Samuel Whitbread (30 August 1720 – 11 June 1796) was an English brewer and Member of Parliament. In 1742, he established a brewery that in 1799 became Whitbread & Co Ltd.

Early years
Samuel Whitbread was born on 20 August 1720 at Cardington in Bedfordshire, the seventh of eight children of Henry Whitbread. At 12, he received two years' education with a local clergyman, before being sent at age 14 to London to live with family (most likely, his uncle). At age 16, his family paid £300 for him to be taken as an apprentice at a brewery under John Wightman (Master of the Brewers' Company from 1734 to 1735).

Brewing

After learning the brewery trade, Samuel Whitbread went into partnership with Godfrey and Thomas Shewell in 1742, investing £2,600 in two of the Shewell's small breweries, the Goat Brewhouse (where porter was produced) in Old Street and a brewery nearby in Brick Lane (used to produce pale and amber beers).

Demand for the strong, black porter had begun to the grow and Whitbread identified the need for scale to ensure commercial success, moving the business to larger premises on the site of the derelict Kings Head Brewery in Chiswell Street in 1750.

Starting over, Whitbread invested in all the latest technology to industrialize production, storing the beer in large vats. The brewery was also one of the first to employ a steam engine (purchasing a sun and planet gear engine, the Whitbread Engine, from James Watt's company in 1785). While not the first to discover Porter production, Whitbread became the first to exploit it commercially on a large scale and this coincided with an increase in beer consumption in the UK, following regulations to limit the sale of gin owing to the excesses of the Gin Craze.

By 1760, it had become the second largest brewery in London (producing almost 64,000 barrels annually). By 1770 Whitbread had bought out his partners for £30,000. By the end of the century, Whitbread's business was London's biggest producer of beer, producing 202,000 barrels in 1796. In May 1787 the brewery was visited by King George III and Queen Charlotte. By 1793, Whitbread had become a Freeman of the Brewers' Company.

Member of Parliament

Whitbread was appointed High Sheriff of Hertfordshire for 1767–68 and elected Member of Parliament for Bedford in 1768, and held the seat until 1790, and then represented Steyning from 1792 to 1796. He was an early supporter for the abolition of slavery, took part in some of the anti-slavery debates of 1788 in the House of Commons.

Family
Whitbread married firstly Harriet Hayton, by whom he had two daughters, one of whom, Emma Maria Elizabeth Whitbread, married Henry St John, 13th Baron St John of Bletso, and one son, the politician, Samuel Whitbread. The other daughter, Harriet, married James Gordon MP. Harriet died in 1769 and is buried in Cardington Parish Church. Her memorial is by Richard Hayward.

He married secondly Lady Mary Cornwallis (1736–70), eldest daughter of Charles Cornwallis, 1st Earl Cornwallis, with whom he had one daughter, Mary Whitbread (1770–1858). Mary married Sir George Grey, 1st Baronet, 3rd son of Charles Grey, Lord Howick.

Whitbread became wealthy from the success of his brewery and bought several large estates: these included Lord Torrington's Southill Park, Elstow Manor, and other substantial property in Bedfordshire and High House, Purfleet, Essex. His real estate purchases were worth in the region of £400,000—equal to over £8 million in 1992.

Samuel Whitbread died on 11 June 1796 at Bedworth Park. The Gentleman's Magazine speculated that he was "worth over a million pounds".

References

English brewers
Brewing in London
Whig (British political party) MPs
Members of the Parliament of Great Britain for English constituencies
British MPs 1768–1774
British MPs 1774–1780
British MPs 1780–1784
British MPs 1784–1790
British MPs 1790–1796
1720 births
1796 deaths
Whitbread people
High Sheriffs of Hertfordshire
18th-century English businesspeople
People from Cardington, Bedfordshire
People from Southill, Bedfordshire